The Delchar Theater on W. Main St. in Mayville, North Dakota, United States, was built in 1927.  It was listed on the National Register of Historic Places (NRHP) in 1985.

According to its NRHP nomination, it "is significant to the City of Mayville for its
role as a major entertainment site."

References

Art Deco architecture in North Dakota
Theatres completed in 1927
Theatres on the National Register of Historic Places in North Dakota
National Register of Historic Places in Traill County, North Dakota
1927 establishments in North Dakota
Mayville, North Dakota